The Mill River is a tributary of the Saint George River in Thomaston, Maine.

See also 
 List of rivers of Maine

References 

 Maine Streamflow Data from the USGS
 Maine Watershed Data From Environmental Protection Agency

Rivers of Knox County, Maine
Rivers of Maine